Shipley is a constituency represented in the House of Commons of the UK Parliament since 2005 by Philip Davies, a Conservative.

Boundaries 

1885–1918: The Municipal Borough of Bradford, and the civil parishes of Clayton, Eccleshill, Idle, North Bierley, and Shipley.

1918–1950: The Urban Districts of Baildon, Bingley, Guiseley, Shipley, and Yeadon, and in the Rural District of Wharfedale the civil parishes of Esholt, Hawksworth, and Menston.

1950–1983: The Urban Districts of Baildon, Bingley, and Shipley.

1983–2010: The District of Bradford wards of Baildon, Bingley, Bingley Rural, Rombalds, Shipley East, and Shipley West.

2010–present: The District of Bradford wards of Baildon, Bingley, Bingley Rural, Shipley, Wharfedale, and Windhill and Wrose.

History

1885–1970
This seat was created in the Redistribution of Seats Act 1885.  Until 1923 the seat was almost exclusively represented by elected Liberals and Arthur Creech Jones was Secretary of State for the Colonies (1946–1950) during most of the Attlee Ministry.

MPs since 1970
Shipley was for a long time the seat of ex-Chairman of the Conservative 1922 Committee, Sir Marcus Fox. He held the seat for almost 30 years between the 1970 and 1997 general elections.

At the 1997 general election, the Labour candidate Chris Leslie gained the seat from Fox, becoming the youngest MP of that parliament. He held the seat at the 2001 election and became a junior minister. A number of traditional Labour supporters considered Leslie to be an ardent Blairite, though he was in fact equally close to Gordon Brown, one of whose staff he married, and whose campaign for election as Labour leader he helped run (after he had lost this seat).

Leslie narrowly lost the seat in the 2005 election, when the Conservative Party candidate Philip Davies narrowly regained the seat with a majority of 422 votes, which then increased to nearly ten thousand votes at the May 2010 general election. Although it has remained with the Conservative Party since 2005, it has arguably become a swing seat, similar to nearby Keighley.

Members of Parliament

Elections

Elections in the 2010s

Elections in the 2000s

Elections in the 1990s

Elections in the 1980s

Elections in the 1970s

Elections in the 1960s

Elections in the 1950s

Election in the 1940s

Elections in the 1930s

Elections in the 1920s

Elections in the 1910s

Elections in the 1900s

Elections in the 1890s

Elections in the 1880s

See also 
 List of parliamentary constituencies in West Yorkshire

Notes

References

Sources
Political Science Resources Richard Kimber
F. W. S. Craig, British Parliamentary Election Results 1885 - 1918
F. W. S. Craig, British Parliamentary Election Results 1974 - 1979

Parliamentary constituencies in Yorkshire and the Humber
Constituencies of the Parliament of the United Kingdom established in 1885
Politics of Bradford
Shipley, West Yorkshire